Iván Ferreiro Rodríguez (born 15 August 1970) is a Spanish singer-songwriter born in Vigo, Galicia. He was the voice, leader and composer of the popular pop-rock band Los Piratas.

Career

After Los Piratas split, by late 2003, Iván kept playing with his brother Amaro in a pub in Vigo, called El Ensanche. Due to the success of this set of concerts, he decided to record an album with new songs, Canciones para el tiempo y la distancia, that was released in 2005. In the tour of the album, Tournedo, Iván was accompanied by his brother on the guitar and Karlos Arancegui at the drum kit.

In November 2005, Iván thought up a project called Laboratorio Ñ, consisting of collecting some Spanish and Argentinian musicians in a house at Buenos Aires, to write new songs among friends. Some of these musicians were Juan Aguirre and Eva Amaral (Amaral), Xoel López (singer of Deluxe) or Quique González.

In October 2006, he released Las siete y media, a mini-album with 8 songs (7 and a half, as in Iván words) written during the Tournedo tour. In 2008, he released a new album Mentiroso Mentiroso, followed by Picninc Extraterrestre in 2010 and his most recent album Confesiones de un artista de mierda recorded in 2011 live in front of an audience as a combination of new songs, collaborations and a new reading of some of Los Piratas and his own greatest hits.

Discography 

, Iván Ferreiro has released four solo albums.

Collaborations
Més raons de pes. El tribut a Umpah-Pah CD (2009), collaboration with Enrique Bunbury, Amparanoia and Pep Blay as art director.

External links 
Iván Ferreiro official page 
Iván Ferreiro personal blog 
Group of fans of Iván Ferreiro 
Official webstore of Iván Ferreiro

References

Singers from Galicia (Spain)
Living people
People from Nigrán
1970 births
21st-century Spanish singers
21st-century Spanish male singers